1995 Japanese Super Cup was the Japanese Super Cup competition. The match was played at National Stadium in Tokyo on March 11, 1995. Verdy Kawasaki won the championship.

Match details

References

Japanese Super Cup
Super Cup
Japanese Super Cup
Tokyo Verdy matches
Shonan Bellmare matches
Japanese Super Cup 1995